Ester Aparecida dos Santos (born 9 December 1982), commonly known mononymously as Ester, is a Brazilian former footballer. She played as a "volante" (defensive midfielder) for clubs including Chelsea of the English FA WSL and BV Cloppenburg of the German Frauen-Bundesliga. Ester was part of the Brazil women's national football team who finished as runners-up in the 2007 World Cup and 2008 Summer Olympics.

Career 
Ester began playing as a child in her neighbourhood near the São Paulo-Guarulhos International Airport. She was signed for Clube Atlético Juventus after a trial, then moved on to Santos FC.

In 2007 Ester played for CEPE-Caxias in Rio de Janeiro. She rejoined Santos in January 2008, following her successful season away.

In the 2008 WPS International Draft, Ester was selected by Sky Blue FC alongside compatriot Rosana, but did not join the team. Instead Ester found success in the Copa Libertadores Femenina with Santos in 2009 and 2010.

Ester was part of a Brazilian contingent at Russian champions WFC Rossiyanka in 2012, playing in the UEFA Women's Champions League defeat to Turbine Potsdam.

In 2013 Ester made a total of 10 FA WSL appearances for Chelsea, before departing for newly promoted Bundesliga club BV Cloppenburg in September 2013 with three games of the English season remaining. Chelsea manager Emma Hayes sold Sofia Jakobsson to the German team at the same time, saying: "We received an offer from Cloppenburg which we feIt was good business for the club."

When Vasco da Gama relaunched again in 2016, Ester was signed to provide experience to the team's younger players. After her retirement from football Ester settled in Arapongas and worked as a businesswoman.

International 
Ester was called up to the Brazil women's national football team in 2003. She had been on the fringes of the squad, until winning her place in midfield during Brazil's 2007 Pan American Games campaign. She maintained her position as the team's defensive midfielder for the 2007 FIFA Women's World Cup. She played in the final, which Brazil lost 2–0 to Germany.

Ester played in the 2011 FIFA Women's World Cup as well as the 2008 and 2012 Summer Olympics. At the beginning of the 2012 tournament in London, she had 56 caps and one goal for the national team.

See also

 Foreign players in the FA WSL

References

External links
 

1982 births
Living people
People from Guarulhos
Brazilian women's footballers
Women's association football midfielders
Olympic footballers of Brazil
Olympic silver medalists for Brazil
Footballers at the 2008 Summer Olympics
Footballers at the 2012 Summer Olympics
2011 FIFA Women's World Cup players
Olympic medalists in football
Santos FC (women) players
Medalists at the 2008 Summer Olympics
Brazil women's international footballers
Brazilian expatriate women's footballers
Expatriate women's footballers in Russia
Brazilian expatriates in Russia
WFC Rossiyanka players
Chelsea F.C. Women players
Women's Super League players
Expatriate women's footballers in England
Brazilian expatriate sportspeople in England
Expatriate women's footballers in Germany
Brazilian expatriate sportspeople in Germany
Footballers from São Paulo (state)
Pan American Games gold medalists for Brazil
Pan American Games medalists in football
2007 FIFA Women's World Cup players
Footballers at the 2003 Pan American Games
Footballers at the 2007 Pan American Games
São José Esporte Clube (women) players
Medalists at the 2003 Pan American Games
Medalists at the 2007 Pan American Games
São Paulo FC (women) players
CR Vasco da Gama (women) players